Mohammad Shahid (born 24 August 2000 in Hub, Balochistan) is a Pakistani cricketer who plays for Balochistan. Shahid made his List A debut for Balochistan against Sindh on 4 March 2022 during the 2021–22 Pakistan Cup.

References

External links 
 
 Mohammad Shahid at Pakistan Cricket Board

2000 births
Living people
Pakistani cricketers
Balochistan cricketers